The politics of Vietnam is dominated by a single party, the Communist Party of Vietnam (CPV). The President of Vietnam is the head of state, and the Prime Minister of Vietnam is the head of government, both of these are separate from the General Secretary of the Communist Party of Vietnam who leads the Communist Party and is head of the Politburo and the Central Military Commission, thus the General Secretary is the de facto supreme leader of Vietnam. Executive power is exercised by the government and the President of Vietnam. Legislative power is vested in the National Assembly of Vietnam. The Judiciary is independent of the executive. The parliament adopted the current Constitution of Vietnam, its fifth, on 28 November 2013.

The Vietnamese political system is authoritarian, with the freedom of assembly, association, expression, press and religion as well as civil society activism being tightly restricted. There are no freely elected national leaders, political opposition is suppressed, all religious activity is controlled by the CPV, and dissent is not permitted and civil rights are curtailed. Elections in Vietnam occur under a single-party authoritarian political system. Vietnam is among the few contemporary party-led dictatorships to not hold any direct elections at the national level. The competitive nature of the elections is highly constrained by the Communist Party's monopoly on power in Vietnam, limitations on free speech, and government interference with the elections.

The National Assembly is a unicameral legislative body. The National Assembly has 500 members, elected by popular vote to serve four-year terms. The legislature is, according to the constitution, the highest organ of the state. Its powers includes the enactment and amendment of the constitution and laws; the adoption of the government budget; supervising the Government of Vietnam and other holders of public powers responsible to the National Assembly; and appointing members of the judiciary. The Vietnamese constitution and legislation provide for regular elections for the office of the President of the Socialist Republic, the National Assembly and the People's Councils. 

The President is elected by National Assembly for a five-year term and acts as the de jure commander-in-chief of the Vietnam People's Armed Forces and Chairman of the Council for Defence and Security. However, the president has the right to decide on executive brands. The government, the main executive state power of Vietnam, is headed by the Prime Minister, who has several Deputy Prime Ministers and several ministers in charge of particular activities. The executive branch is responsible for the implementation of political, economic, cultural, social, national defence, security and external activities of the state.

Vietnam has a judicial system governed by the Constitution of Vietnam and national legislation enacted by National Assembly. The Supreme People's Court is the highest court of appeal in Vietnam. There are other specialised courts in Vietnam, including the Central Military Court, the Criminal Court, the Civil Court and the Appeal Court. The Supreme People's Procuracy observes the implementation of state organs and makes sure that Vietnamese citizens follow the law.

Legal framework

Vietnam is a one-party socialist republic. The current Vietnamese state traces its direct lineage back to the Democratic Republic of Vietnam (North Vietnam) and the 1945 August Revolution led by Hồ Chí Minh. The current constitution was adopted on 28 November 2013 by the National Assembly of Vietnam. There have been four other constitutions in Vietnamese history: the 1946, 1959, 1980, and 1992 constitutions. The Communist Party of Vietnam, the leading non-State organ, operates in accordance with the laws. Government powers in Vietnam are divided into legislative, executive and judiciary powers. Vietnam's legal system is based upon socialist legality according to Article 12 of the constitution.

State ideology

Vietnam is a socialist republic with a one-party system led by the Communist Party of Vietnam (CPV). The CPV espouses Marxism–Leninism and Hồ Chí Minh Thought, the political philosophy and ideology of the late Hồ Chí Minh. The two ideologies function as a firm ideological basis and serve as guidance for the activities of the Party and state. According to the Constitution, Vietnam is "in the period of transition to socialism". Marxism–Leninism was introduced to Vietnam in the 1920s and 1930s, and Vietnamese culture has been led under the banner of patriotism and Marxism–Leninism. Hồ Chí Minh's beliefs were not systematised during his life, nor quickly following his death. Trường Chinh's biography of "Chairman Hồ" in 1973 emphasised his revolutionary policies. The thoughts of Hồ Chí Minh were systematised in 1989, under the leadership of Nguyễn Văn Linh. Hồ Chí Minh Thought, alongside Marxism–Leninism, became the official ideology of the CPV and the state in 1991. The CPV's claim to legitimacy was retained following the collapse of communism in 1989 and the dissolution of the Soviet Union in 1991 by its commitment to the thoughts of Hồ Chí Minh, according to Sophie Quinn-Judge. According to Pierre Brocheux, the author of Ho Chi Minh: a Biography, the current state ideology is Hồ Chí Minh Thought, with Marxism–Leninism playing a secondary role. While some claim that Hồ Chí Minh Thought is used as a veil for the Party leadership since they, according to this version, have stopped believing in communism, others claim this is not true considering that Hồ Chí Minh was an avid supporter of the dictatorship of the proletariat. Others see Hồ Chí Minh Thought as a political umbrella term whose main function is to smuggle in non-socialist ideas and policies without challenging socialist legality.

Since its foundation, the key ideology has been Marxism–Leninism, but since the introduction of a mixed economy in the late 1980s and 1990s, it has lost its monopolistic ideological and moral legitimacy. As became clear because of the Đổi Mới reforms, the Party could not base its rule on defending only the workers and the peasants, which was officially referred to as the "working class-peasant alliance". In the constitution introduced in 1992, the State represented the "workers, peasants and intellectuals". In recent years, the Party has stopped representing a specific class, but instead the "interests of the entire people", which includes entrepreneurs. The final class barrier was removed in 2002, when party members were allowed to engage in private activities. In the face of de-emphasising the role of Marxism–Leninism, the Party has acquired a broader ideology, placing more emphasis on nationalism, developmentalism, and becoming the protector of tradition.

Communist Party of Vietnam

According to the official version, the Communist Party of Vietnam is leading the Vietnamese people "in carrying out the country's renovation, modernisation and industrialisation." According to the Party's statute, amended at the 9th National Congress on 22 April 2001, the CPV was "established and trained by President Hồ Chí Minh, has led the Vietnamese people to carry out successfully the August Revolution, establishing the Democratic Republic of Việt Nam, now the Socialist Republic of Việt Nam, to defeat foreign invaders, to abolish the colonial and feudalist regime, to liberate and reunify the country, and then carry out the cause of renovation and socialist construction and firmly defend national independence." It believes in socialist internationalism of the working class, and supports the "struggle for peace, national independence, democracy and social progress of the world's people." The CPV acts as the vanguard of the working people and the whole nation by representing their interests. Its aim is to create "a strong, independent, prosperous and democratic country with an equitable and civilized society, to realise socialism and ultimately, communism." The Party's ideological foundation is Marxism–Leninism and Hồ Chí Minh Thoughts. These ideologies guide the activities of the Party, while promoting "the nation's traditions, and absorbing other nations' essential ideas."

The CPV is organised on the principles of democratic centralism. It practices "criticism, self-criticism, and strict discipline" and pursues "collective leadership and individual responsibility, and promoting comradeship and solidarity in line with the Party's political programs and statutes." The CPV is subject to Vietnamese laws and the Constitution. It is the country's ruling party and promotes the "mastery of the people over the country". The Party is under the supervision of the people. It is dependent on having the people contribute to the party, by strengthening, uniting, and leading the people in the revolutionary cause. The political system in Vietnam is led by the CPV, and it "leads, respects and promotes the role of the State, the Vietnamese Fatherland Front (VFF) and other socio-political organisations."

Congress

The National Congress is the party's highest organ. The direction of the Party and the Government is decided at the National Congress, held every fifth year. The Central Committee is elected by the National Congress. Delegates vote on policies and candidate posts within the central party leadership. Following ratification of the decisions taken at the National Congress, the National Congress dissolves itself. The Central Committee, which is elected by the National Congress every fifth year, implements the decisions of the National Congress in the five-year period. Since the Central Committee only meets twice a year, the Politburo implements the policies of the National Congress.

Central Committee

The Central Committee (CC) is the CPV's most powerful institution. It delegates some of its powers to the Secretariat and the Politburo when it is not in session. When the Vietnam War ended in 1975, the Vietnamese leadership, led by Lê Duẩn, began to centralise power. This policy continued until the 6th National Congress, when Nguyễn Văn Linh took power. Linh pursued a policy of economic and political decentralisation. The party and state bureaucracy opposed Linh's reform initiatives; because of this, Linh tried to win the support of provincial leaders. This caused the powers of the provincial chapters of the CPV to increase in the 1990s. The CPV lost its power to appoint or dismiss provincial-level officials in the 1990s; this is proven by the fact that Võ Văn Kiệt tried to wrestle this power back to the centre during the 1990s without success. These developments led to the provincialisation of the Central Committee; for example, more and more CC members have a background in provincial party work. Because of these changes, power in Vietnam has become increasingly devolved. The number of Central Committee members with a provincial background increased from a low of 15.6 percent in 1982 to a high of 41 percent in 2000. The former President of the Socialist Republic of Vietnam Trương Tấn Sang (2011–2016) was directly elected from the provinces at the 8th Party Congress, held in 1996. Because of the devolution of power, the powers of the Central Committee have increased substantially; for instance, when a two-thirds majority of the Politburo voted in favour of retaining Lê Khả Phiêu as General Secretary (the leader of Vietnam), the Central Committee voted against the Politburo's motion and voted unanimously in favour of removing Lê Khả Phiêu from his post of General Secretary. The Central Committee did this because the majority of its members were of provincial background, or were working in the provinces; because of this, these members were the first to feel the pinch when the economy began to stagnate during Lê Khả Phiêu's rule.

The Central Committee elects the Politburo in the aftermath of the Party Congress. Since the full Central Committee meets only once a year, the Politburo functions as the Party's leading collective decision-making body. The Secretariat is also elected by the Central Committee, and is headed by the General Secretary. It is responsible for solving organisational problems and implementing the demands of the Central Committee. The Secretariat oversees the work of the Commissions of the Central Committee. The General Secretary is the de facto leader of Vietnam.

|General Secretary of the Central Committee
|rowspan="2"| Nguyễn Phú Trọng
|Communist Party
|rowspan="2"| 19 January 2011
|-
|Secretary of the Central Military Commission
|Communist Party
|-
|Secretary of the Central Public Security Commission
|Tô Lâm
|Communist party
| May 2016
|-
|Executive Secretary of the Secretariat
|Võ Văn Thưởng
|Communist Party
|2021
|-
|Head of the Central Commission of Organization
|Trương Thị Mai
|Communist Party
|5 April 2021
|-
|Chairman of the Central Commission for Inspection
|Trần Cẩm Tú
|Communist Party
|9 May 2018
|-
|Head of the Central Commission of Propaganda
|Nguyễn Trọng Nghĩa
|Communist Party
|2021
|-
|Chairman of the Central Theoretical Council
|Nguyễn Xuân Thắng
|Communist Party
|28 March 2011
|-
|Head of the Central Commission of Popularization
|Bùi Thị Minh Hoài
|Communist Party
|2021
|-
|Head of the Central Office
|Lê Minh Hưng
|Communist Party
|2021
|-
|Head of the Central Commission of External Affairs 
|Lê Hoài Trung
|Communist Party
|2021
|-
|Head of the Central Commission of Economy
|Trần Tuấn Anh 
|Communist Party
|2021
|-
|Head of the Central Commission of Internal Affairs
|Phan Đình Trạc
|Communist Party
|26 February 2016 (Acting Head since 2015)
|}

The following is the official order of precedence of the Politburo according to the 13th National Party Congress.

 Nguyễn Phú Trọng, Party General Secretary
 Nguyễn Xuân Phúc, State President
 Phạm Minh Chính, Prime Minister
 Vương Đình Huệ, Chairman of the National Assembly
 Trần Tuấn Anh, Head of the PCC’s Commission of Economics
 Nguyễn Hoà Bình, Chief Justice of the Supreme People's Court
 Lương Cường, General, Chairman of the General Department of Politics of the Vietnam People's Army
 Đinh Tiến Dũng, Secretary of Ha Noi Municipal Party Committee
 Phan Văn Giang, Minister of National Defence
 Tô Lâm, Minister of Public Security
 Trương Thị Mai, Head of the Party's Central Committee's Commission of Organisational Affairs
 Trần Thanh Mẫn, Deputy Chairman of the National Assembly
 Phạm Bình Minh, Deputy Prime Minister
 Nguyễn Văn Nên, Secretary of the Ho Chi Minh city Party Committee
 Nguyễn Xuân Thắng, Director of the Ho Chi Minh National Academy of Politics, Chairman of the Central Theoretical Council
 Võ Văn Thưởng, Standing Member of the Secretariat of the Party
 Phan Đình Trạc, Head of the PCC’s Commission of Internal Affairs
 Trần Cẩm Tú, Chairman of the PCC’s Commission of Inspection

The Secretariat (term 13) includes some Politburo members assigned to join the Secretariat and 5 comrades elected at the first PCC meeting (term 13).
 Nguyễn Phú Trọng, Party General Secretary
 Võ Văn Thưởng, Standing Member of the Secretariat of the Party
 Trương Thị Mai, Head of the Party's Central Committee's Commission of Organisational Affairs
 Trần Cẩm Tú, Chairman of the PCC’s Commission of Inspection
 Phan Đình Trạc, Head of the PCC’s Commission of Internal Affairs
 Nguyễn Hòa Bình, Chief Justice of the Supreme People's Court
 Đỗ Văn Chiến, Chairman of the Presidium of the Vietnamese Fatherland Front
 Bùi Thị Minh Hoài, Head of the Central Commission of Popularization
 Lê Minh Hưng, Chief of the Office of the PCC
 Lê Minh Khái, Deputy Prime Minister
 Nguyễn Trọng Nghĩa, Head of the Central Commission of Propaganda

Fatherland Front

The Vietnamese Fatherland Front (VFF) is an umbrella group of pro-communist movements. According to Article 9 of the Constitution, the VFF and its members constitute "the political base of people's power". The state must create a favorable environment for the VFF and its member organisations. The VFF is a voluntary mass organisation of political, socio-political and social organisations and "individuals from all classes, social strata, ethnic groups, and religions, including overseas Vietnamese." Its main objectives are to gather and build a people unity bloc, "strengthen the people's political and spiritual consensus, encourage the people to promote their mastership, to implement the CPV's guidelines and policies, and to abide by the Constitution and laws." The VFF is governed on the principles of "democratic consensus, coordinated and united action." Its organisation has been modelled after the state structure, and the VFF has its own independent statute. Notable member organisations of the VFF include the General Confederation of Labour, the Hồ Chí Minh Communist Youth Union and the Veteran Association, among others.

|Chairman of the Central Committee
|Đỗ Văn Chiến
|Communist Party
|2021
|-
|Deputy Chairman of the Central Committee
|rowspan="2"|Hầu A Lềnh
|Communist Party
|rowspan="2"|2017
|-
|General Secretary of the Central Committee
|Communist Party
|}

Executive

The President of the Republic is the head of state, elected to a five-year term by the National Assembly, and is limited by the Constitution to a maximum tenure of 3 terms. In addition to being the Chairman of the Council for Defence and Security and commander-in-chief of the Vietnam People's Armed Forces, the president has the procedural duty of appointing or dismissing of the Vice Presidents, Prime Minister, Deputy Chief Judge of the Supreme People's Court and Head of the Supreme People's Procuracy, with the consent of the National Assembly through a simple majority vote. The President has influence on foreign policy, and has the right to declare a state of emergency and to declare war.

The Government It is headed by the president, prime minister and consists of deputy prime ministers, ministers and other members. The Government is a unified administration responsible for the implementation of political, economic, cultural, social, national defence, security and external activities of the state. It is also responsible for the effectiveness of the state apparatus itself from the top down, stabilisation in the country and the observance of the constitution. As with the President, the Government is elected by the deputies of the National Assembly for a five-year term. The Prime Minister of the Government is the head of government and is elected or dismissed by the National Assembly, at the request of the president. Since 5 April 2021, the prime minister of the government has been Phạm Minh Chính.

|President
|Võ Văn Thưởng
|Communist Party
|2 March 2023
|-
|Vice President
|Võ Thị Ánh Xuân
|Communist Party
| 6 April 2021
|-
|Prime Minister
|Phạm Minh Chính
|Communist Party
|5 April 2021
|-
|Deputy Prime Minister
|Phạm Bình Minh
|Communist Party
|2013
|-
|Deputy Prime Minister
|Lê Minh Khái
|Communist Party
|  2021
|-
|Deputy Prime Minister
|Vũ Đức Đam
|Communist Party
| 2013
|-
|Deputy Prime Minister
|Lê Van Thành
|Communist Party
| 2021
|-
|}

Legislative

The National Assembly is a unicameral legislative body, and is governed on the basis of democratic centralism. It is the highest representative organ and the highest state organ. The National Assembly is the only organ vested with constitutional and legislative powers. It is responsible for fundamental domestic and foreign policies, socio-economic policies, defence and security issues, and it exercises supreme control over all state activities. Delegates (or members) of the National Assembly are elected through secret ballots in democratic elections which are held every fifth year. The National Assembly is convened twice a year, and its Standing Committee represents it between sessions.

The membership of the Standing Committee consists of the Chairman, deputy chairmen and other members; these members are elected by the National Assembly. Standing Committee members cannot simultaneously be members of the Government. Members work on a full-time basis, and their terms of office correspond with the term of the National Assembly. The Standing Committee continues to function until a new National Assembly is elected. According to the constitution, the Standing Committee is responsible for 12 duties. Of these, the most important are the powers to announce, convene and chair the National Assembly sessions, to interpret the constitution, laws and ordinances, and to issue ordinances on those matters assigned by the National Assembly. It supervises and guides the People's Councils and their activities, and directs, regulates and coordinates the activities of the Ethnic Council and the committees of the National Assembly.

There are seven committees of the National Assembly. Committee membership is determined by the National Assembly. They are responsible for the studying and examination of bills, legislative initiatives, drafts of ordinances and other drafts of legal documents and reports assigned by the National Assembly or the Standing Committee. The committees provide the National Assembly and its Standing Committee with their opinions on the legislative programme. The committees supervise and conduct investigations within their respective competency and exercise powers which are stipulated by law. The National Assembly elects the Ethnic Council, which consists of a Chairman, Deputy Chairmen and other members. The Ethnic Council studies and recommends actions to the National Assembly; the National Assembly has to consult with the Ethnic Council before issuing any decisions on ethnic policy. The Chairman of the Ethnic Council has to attend meetings of the Government which concern ethnic policy. The powers of the Ethnic Council are comparable to those of the committees.

|Chairman
|Vương Đình Huệ
|Communist Party
| 31 March 2021
|-
|Deputy Chairman
|Trần Thanh Mẫn
|Communist Party
| 2021
|-
|Deputy Chairman
|Nguyễn Khắc Định
|Communist Party
| 2021
|-
|Deputy Chairman
|Nguyễn Đức Hải
|Communist Party
| 2021
|-
|Deputy Chairman
|General Trần Quang Phương
|Communist Party
| 20 July 2021
|-
|Chairman of the Ethnic Council
|Y Thanh Hà Niê Kđăm
|Communist Party
| 21 July 2021
|}

Judiciary

The Vietnamese judicial system is based upon Socialist legality. The country's highest judicial organ is the Supreme People's Court (SPC). The composition of the SPC includes the Chief Justice, Deputy Chief Judge, jurors and court secretaries. The structure of the SPC (from the top down) is as follows: Council of Judges, Commission of Judges, Central Military Court, Criminal Court, Civil Court, Appeal Court, and assisting staff. The Chief Judge of the SPC is elected by the National Assembly, while the President of the Socialist Republic has the power to nominate and dismiss the Deputy Chief Judge and judges at the Chief Judge's request. The Central Committee of the Vietnamese Fatherland Front introduces People's Jurors, which are in turn appointed by the Standing Committee of the National Assembly. According to the Government Web Portal, the operating principles of the courts are, during hearings, that the "judges and jurors are independent and only obey the laws." Justice and democracy within the system is supposedly ensured because legal decision-making is an open process. Jurors play an essential role, and defenders have the right of defence and to hire a lawyer.

The Supreme People's Prosecutor (SPP), the Vietnamese equivalent to an attorney general, observes the implementation process of the Ministries, ministerial-level agencies, government organs, local authorities, social and economic organisations, the armed forces, security forces and the Vietnamese citizens in general. The SPP respects the Constitution and state laws, practices public prosecution as stated by the law and ensures law enforcement. The head of the SPP is elected, dismissed, or removed from office by a proposal of the President. The Deputy Heads, prosecutors and inspectors appointed by the SPP head can be dismissed by the President on the Head's request.

The SPC is the highest court for appeal and review, and it reports to the National Assembly, which controls the judiciary's budget and confirms the president's nominees to the SPC and SPP. The SPP issues arrest warrants, sometimes retroactively. Below the SPC are district and provincial people's courts, military tribunals, and administrative, economic and labor courts. The people's courts are the courts of first instance. The Ministry of Defence (MOD) has military tribunals, which have the same rules as civil courts. Military judges and assessors are selected by the MOD and the SPC, but the SPC has supervisory responsibility. Although the constitution provides for independent judges and lay assessors (who lack administrative training), the United States Department of State maintains that Vietnam lacks an independent judiciary, in part because the Communist Party selects judges and vets them for political reliability. Moreover, the party seeks to influence the outcome of cases involving perceived threats to the state or the party's dominant position. In an effort to increase judicial independence, the government transferred local courts from the Ministry of Justice to the SPC in September 2002. However, the Department of State saw no evidence that the move actually achieved the stated goal. Vietnam's judiciary is also hampered by a shortage of lawyers and by rudimentary trial procedures. The death penalty often is imposed in cases of corruption and drug trafficking.

|Head of the Steering Committee of the Central Judicial Reform
|Nguyễn Xuân Phúc
|Communist Party
|2021
|-
|Chief Justice of the Supreme People's Court
|Nguyễn Hòa Bình
|Communist Party
|8 April 2016
|-
|Director of the Supreme People's Prosecutor
|Lê Minh Trí
|Communist Party
|8 April 2016
|}

Elections

Article 6 of the Constitution states that "The people make use of state power through the agency of the National Assembly and the People's Councils, which represent the will and aspirations of the people, are elected by them and responsible to them". Deputies (members) of the National Assembly are directly elected on a democratic basis through secret ballots. All citizens who are 18 or older, regardless of ethnic group, gender, social position, belief, religion, level of education, occupation or length of residency have the right to vote, the exceptions being the mentally disabled and those people who have been deprived of the right to vote by law. People aged 21 or older have the right to stand as a candidate at elections. Three election commissions have been established to manage elections; at the central level is the Election Council, at the provincial level and in centrally-run cities the Election Committee is responsible for election monitoring and the Election Commission is responsible for election monitoring at constituencies.

The current 500 members of the National Assembly were elected during the 2016
 parliamentary election, and they have a five-year term. Despite foreign criticism, it is generally believed that the National Assembly has become more powerful in recent years. The last election was held, according to the authorities, in a democratic, fair, lawful and safe manner and was considered a success. Voter turnout was 99.51 percent; nearly 62 million people voted. In their respective constituencies, Nguyễn Phú Trọng, the General Secretary, was elected to the National Assembly with 85.63 percent of the votes, Prime Minister Nguyễn Tấn Dũng was elected with 95.38 percent and President Trương Tấn Sang was elected with 80.19 percent. Outside the ruling troika, it was Nguyễn Xuân Phúc, the Chairman of the Government Office, who was elected with the highest margin, with 94.59 percent of the votes. The number of self-nominated candidates was four times higher than the previous election. Fifteen out of the 182 candidates nominated by the central government and the central party leadership were defeated in the elections. Lê Thị Thu Ba, a member of the Party's Central Committee and Chairman of the Committee of Law during the 12th National Assembly (2007–2011), was not re-elected to the National Assembly. Several capitalists were elected to the assembly, but due to the socialist ideology of the state, they are not allowed to sit on the assembly's Committee on Economy and Budget.

Nguyễn Sinh Hùng, the Chairman of the National Assembly, nominated Trương Tấn Sang for the Presidency. 487 deputies of the National Assembly, meaning 97.4 percent, voted in favour of Trương Tấn Sang. In his victory speech, Trương Tấn Sang said, "I pledge to improve my moral quality and study the example of the late President Hồ Chí Minh to cooperate with the government to bring Vietnam to become a fully industrialized country by 2015."

Latest parliamentary election

Latest presidential election

Local government

Provinces and municipalities are subdivided into towns, districts and villages. Provinces and municipalities are centrally controlled by the national government. Towns, districts and villages are locally accountable to some degree through elected people's councils. Certain cities and provinces are under direct control of the central government. The provinces are divided into districts, provincial cities and towns; cities under direct rule are divided into towns, urban and rural districts. In turn, the district is divided into communes and townlets. In the words of Article 118 of the Constitution, the "provincial city and the town are divided into wards and communes; the urban district is divided into wards." The establishment of People's Council and People's Committees is determined by law.

In the provinces, the People's Council is the "local organ of State power", and it represents the "aspirations, and mastery of the people". The People's Council is democratically elected, and is accountable to the people and to superior organs of the state. It must pass resolutions which are formal orders of superior organs of state, and it acts on behalf of the constitution. The People's Council decides the plans for socio-economic development, decides the budget and is responsible for national defence and security at the local level. The deputy (member) of the People's Council acts on the behalf of the people, and has the right to make proposals to the People's Council and other local State organs. In turn, officials of these local organs have the responsibility to receive and to examine them.

The People's Council appoint a People's Committee, the executive organ of the People's Council. It is the People's Committee which has the responsibility to implement "the Constitution, the law, the formal written orders of superior State organs and the resolutions of the People's Council." The People's Committee is headed by a Chairman, who acts as the body's leader. All decisions of the People's Committee are taken through a collegial decision-making process, and have to "conform to the will of the majority." The chairman has the power to annul decisions of lower standing organs.

Local officials of the Vietnamese Fatherland Front, its local head, and officials from other mass organisations in the locality have the right to attend the meetings of the People's Council and the People's Committee if relevant problems are discussed. According to Article 125 of the constitution, "The People's Council and the People's Committee shall make regular reports on the local situation in all fields to the Fatherland Front and the mass organisations; shall listen to their opinions and proposals on local power building and socio-economic development; shall cooperate with them in urging the people to work together with the State for the implementation of socio-economic, national-defence, and security tasks in the locality."

List of provinces

References

Bibliography

External links
 Active Citizens under Political Wraps: Experiences from Myanmar/Burma and Vietnam pub. by the Heinrich Böll Vietnam Government Foundation, Chiang Mai, Thailand, November 2006, p. 201.
VUFO-NGO, Directory of Vietnam government ministry and agency websites

 
Government of Vietnam
Vietnam

bn:ভিয়েতনাম#রাজনীতি